A snake is an elongated, legless, predatory reptile.

Snake or Snakes may also refer to:

Devices
 Bore snake, a tool to clean guns
 Plumber's snake
 Snake cable

Games and toys
 Snake (video game)
 Snakes (N-Gage game)
 S.N.A.K.E., a G.I. Joe accessory

Music

Performers
 The Snakes, a British-Norwegian hard rock band
 "Snake", Denis Bélanger (born 1960), Canadian vocalist of the band Voivod 
 Axana Ceulemans, member of the 1990s Belgian girl group Def Dames Dope
 Mark 'Snake' Luckhurst (born 1961), British rock bass guitarist and a founding member of the hard rock band Thunder
 Dave Sabo (born 1964), American rock guitarist in the heavy metal band Skid Row
 DJ Snake, French record producer and DJ

Albums
 Snake (album), by Exuma, 1972
 The Snake (Shane MacGowan album), 1994
 The Snake (Wildbirds & Peacedrums album), 2008
 The Snake, a Harvey Mandel album

Songs
 "Snake" (song), by R. Kelly
 "Snake", by Muddy Waters
 "Snake", by PJ Harvey from Rid of Me, 1993
 "Snake", by G-Unit
 "Snake", by Ronnie Lane
 "Snake", by King Curtis, 2000
 "The Snake" (Al Wilson song), 1968
 "The Snake", by Joe Satriani on the album Not of This Earth
 "The Snake", by Johnny Rivers on the album ...And I Know You Wanna Dance
 "Snakes", by No Doubt on the album The Beacon Street Collection
 "Snakes", by Voltaire on the album The Devil's Bris
 "Snakes", by Papa Roach on the album Infest
 "Snakes", by Six Feet Under on the album True Carnage
 "Snakes", by Bastille on the album Wild World
 "Snakes", by Prodigy on the album Hegelian Dialectic

Places
 Snake Creek (disambiguation)
 Snake Hill, in the U.S. state of New Jersey
 Snake Island (disambiguation)
 Snake River (disambiguation)

People
 Snake Indians, Native Americans
 Reuben Snake (1937–1993), Native American activist, educator, spiritual leader, and tribal leader
 Snake Shyam (born 1967), Indian wildlife conservationist
 The Snake (nickname), various people nicknamed either The Snake or Snake
 "The Snake", ring name of Jake Roberts (born 1955), American professional wrestler
 Snake Williams, a professional wrestler from All-Star Wrestling

Fictional characters
 Snake Plissken, protagonist of the films Escape from New York and Escape from L.A.
 a nickname of John Clark, in Tom Clancy novels and film adaptations
 Snake Jailbird, a Simpsons character
 Archie "Snake" Simpson, a Degrassi character
 Snakes, one of two time traveling warring factions in The Big Time, a science fiction novel by Fritz Leiber
 Snake, a character from the Zero Escape series of visual novels
 Snake, a Black Butler character
 Snake, a The Karate Kid Part III character
 Snake, a The Powerpuff Girls character
 Snake, a Snake Tales character
 Snake, any of several characters in the Metal Gear video game series
 Solid Snake
 Liquid Snake
 Naked Snake, AKA Big Boss
 Venom Snake

Sports teams
 Aberdare RFC, a rugby union club based in Aberdare, Wales, United Kingdom
 Arizona Diamondbacks, a Major League Baseball team based in Phoenix, Arizona, United States
 Columbus Cottonmouths, an ice hockey team based in Columbus, Georgia, United States
 Lugano Snakes, former name of the Lugano Tigers, a Swiss basketball club

In the military
 HMS Snake, several Royal Navy ships
 a nickname of the Bell AH-1 Cobra attack helicopter
 nickname of a variant of the Mark 81 bomb

Other uses
 Snake (computer vision)
 Snake (zodiac)
 The Snake (novel), by Mickey Spillane
 "Snake", a poem by D. H. Lawrence
 "Snakes" (CSI), a television episode
 Snake, a large sculpture created by Richard Serra
 Snake Kung Fu
 Snake, nickname of the first of two NZR B class (1874) steam locomotives

See also
 Rubik's Snake, a puzzle toy